The Socorro Independent School District (SISD) serves more than 47,000 students in 49 schools and is the second largest school district in El Paso, Texas. The district covers 135 square miles serving East El Paso, Horizon City and the City of Socorro. SISD is well known as a destination district for its high-quality instruction, innovative programs, and a supportive and united community. The district operates on a year-round calendar from July to May with a fall and spring intersession.

History
In 1961, the residents of Socorro voted 63-0 for the formation of the Socorro Independent School District. At the time, Escontrias Elementary School was the only campus in the area for students. High school students attended Clint High School or Ysleta High School.

It wasn't until 1964 that the district built its first high school, Socorro High School. Socorro High School would house about 2,800 students for 40 years. The district's Board of Trustees decided that they needed another high school. In 1990, Montwood High School was built. The district built its football stadium, the SISD Student Activities Complex, in 1991. These two schools would begin an annual rivalry in football, in which the winner takes home the "Helmet"; a football helmet with a red side to represent Socorro, and a green side to represent Montwood. Montwood would serve about 3,000 students, when again, the board decided they needed a new school. Americas High School was built in 1996 and serves about 3,000 students.

The next addition to SISD was El Dorado High School. The first senior class graduated in 2007. Eastlake High School joined the district in August 2010, in unincorporated El Paso County adjoining Horizon City. The newest additions to the Socorro Independent School District for the 2015-2016 school year were Purple Heart Elementary School and Pebble Hills High School.

In 2022 the district opened magnet programs, with one specializing in fine arts at Paso Del Norte Elementary School, and one at Escontrias Elementary School specializing in STEAM fields.

In 2022 Nate Carman became the superintendent.

Service area
It includes: Most of Socorro, all of Sparks, portions of El Paso, a portion of Horizon City, and a small section of Homestead Meadows North.

Curriculum
In 1995 Socorro ISD was to open the Inter-American Magnet High School which was to offer Japanese as a subject.

List of schools
All schools are in El Paso except when otherwise indicated.

High schools
 Americas High School
 Eastlake High School 
 El Dorado High School 
 Montwood High School
 Options High School (continuation high school)
 Pebble Hills High School
 Socorro High School (in Socorro)
1994–96 National Blue Ribbon School

Early College Programs
 Mission Early College High School
 Socorro Early College 
 Rams Early College 
 Trailblazers Early College
 Falcon Early College to open in 2019-2020
 Pebble Hills Early College to open in 2019-2020
 Empire Early College to open in 2019-2020 
Synergi4 available in middle schools and high schools

Middle schools
 Grades 6 to 8
 Capt. Walter E. Clarke Middle School
SPC. Rafael Hernando III Middle School 
1997–98 National Blue Ribbon School
 Montwood Middle School
 SSG. Manuel R. Puentes Middle School
 William D. Slider Middle School
 Sun Ridge Middle School
 Col. John O. Ensor Middle School (in Horizon City)
 Salvador H. Sanchez Middle School (in Socorro)
 Socorro Middle School (in Socorro)

K-8 Schools
 Grades kindergarten through eighth-grade
 Bill Sybert School
 Desert Wind School (in the El Paso Hills colonia north of Socorro)
 Jane A. Hambric School
 John Drugan School
 Paso del Norte School
 Ernesto Serna School (in Socorro)

Elementary schools
 Benito Martinez Elementary School
 Cactus Trails Elementary School
 Campestre Elementary School (in Socorro)
 Chester E. Jordan Elementary School
 Dr. Sue Shook Elementary School (in Horizon City)
 Elfida P. Chavez Elementary School
 Escontrias Elementary School (in Socorro)
 H.D. Hilley Elementary School (in Socorro)
 Helen Ball Elementary School
 Horizon Heights Elementary School (in Horizon City)
 Hueco Elementary School (in Socorro)
 Hurshel Antwine Elementary School
 James P. Butler Elementary School
 Loma Verde Elementary School
 Lujan-Chavez Elementary School
 Mission Ridge Elementary School (in Sparks)
 Myrtle Cooper Elementary School
 O'Shea Keleher Elementary School
 Purple Heart Elementary School
 Robert R. Rojas Elementary School (in Socorro)
 Sgt. Jose F. Carrasco Elementary School 
 Sgt. Roberto Ituarte Elementary School
 Sierra Vista Elementary School
 Vista del Sol Elementary School

Alternative schools
 KEYS Academy (grades 1 through 5) (alternative school in Socorro)
 KEYS Academy (grades 6 through 12) (alternative school in Socorro)
 Options High School

References

 2014-2015 TAPR

External links
 SISD homepage

 
School districts in El Paso, Texas
Education in El Paso, Texas